Nocardioides maradonensis is a Gram-positive and rod-shaped bacterium from the genus Nocardioides which has been isolated from rhizosphere soil around the plant Peucedanum japonicum in Jeju, Korea.

References

External links
Type strain of Nocardioides maradonensis at BacDive -  the Bacterial Diversity Metadatabase	

maradonensis
Bacteria described in 2011